SEPTA Regional Rail is the commuter rail system serving Philadelphia, Pennsylvania and its metropolitan region, also known as the Delaware Valley. The system is operated by the Southeastern Pennsylvania Transportation Authority (SEPTA) and serves five counties in Pennsylvania—Bucks, Delaware, Montgomery, Chester, and Philadelphia—as well as Mercer County in New Jersey and New Castle County in Delaware. In the 2019 fiscal year, SEPTA Regional Rail had an annual ridership of 34.2 million, with an average weekday ridership of 118,800.

There are 13 lines within the Regional Rail system, with 155 active stations. Six fare zones in the system determine the ticket price, based on the distance traveled.  Fare zones are designated as Zones 1 through 4 based on the station's distance from Center City Philadelphia with additional zones for stations in the Center City area (CCP zone) and stations in New Jersey (NJ zone). Despite its close proximity to Center City, the four Airport Terminal stations are located within Zone 4.

The Regional Rail system was built in the early 20th century and originally consisted of two separate systems, operated by the Pennsylvania Railroad and the Reading Company, respectively.  SEPTA was formed in 1963, and the Pennsylvania Railroad merged into the Penn Central Transportation Company in 1968. Penn Central and the Reading Company operated the railroads until they were taken over by Conrail in 1976, which operated the system through 1982. SEPTA commenced operation of the Regional Rail Division on January 1, 1983, which gave SEPTA complete operational control of its railroads.

In November 1984, the Center City Commuter Connection opened, a tunnel linking the former Pennsylvania and Penn Central networks, allowing for rail service to travel through the city and continue into adjacent suburbs.  The tunnel also replaced the former Reading Terminal with the new Market East Station (now Jefferson Station).  The 12 Reading and Penn Central lines were combined into seven routes, designated as R1 through R8, with the R4 designation reserved for future use, although it was never used.  The system's newest line, the Airport Line, opened in 1985, taking over the R1 designation from the West Trenton Line and pairing West Trenton service with the R3 Media/Elwyn Line.  In July 2010, the "R" designations for each line were dropped, and lines were renamed after their destinations.

Lines

Stations
All stations are located in Pennsylvania, unless otherwise noted.  Stations located within the City of Philadelphia are additionally distinguished by neighborhood or area as noted on the official SEPTA map.  Accessible stations are noted with the  icon.

Notes

References

SEPTA Regional Rail
SEPTA Regional Rail
SEPTA Regional Rail